Of Cannibals (Des Cannibales) written circa 1580 is an essay, one of those in the collection Essays, by Michel de Montaigne, describing the ceremonies of the Tupinambá people in Brazil. In particular, he reported about how the group ceremoniously ate the bodies of their dead enemies as a matter of honor. In his work, he uses cultural relativism and compares the cannibalism to the "barbarianism" of 16th-century Europe.

An English translation, Of the Caniballes, appeared in John Florio's 1603 translation of the Essais. This has often been viewed (first by Edward Capell in 1781) as an influence on Shakespeare's The Tempest, in particular Act II, Scene 1.

References

External links
Of the Caniballes; 1603 translation by John Florio
Of Cannibals; 1685 translation by Charles Cotton
Michel de Montaigne On the Cannibals; 2017 translation by Ian Johnston

Multiculturalism
16th-century essays
French essays
Essays by Michel de Montaigne
Relativism
Works about cannibalism